Laos is divided into 17 provinces (khoueng) and one prefecture (kampheng nakhon) which includes the capital city Vientiane (Nakhon Louang Viangchan).
Provinces are further divided into districts (muang) and then villages (ban). An 'urban' village is essentially a town.

Administrative Units 
Officially, Laos is divided into 3 administrative tiers, with different types of administrative unit on each tier:

Provinces of Laos

Districts of Laos 

Each Laotian province is subdivided into districts (muang) and then subdivided into villages (baan).

See also 
 Geography of Laos

References